Tanja Ostertag (born 26 September 1987) is a German former professional tennis player.

A native of Stuttgart, Ostertag reached a career high ranking of 287 while competing on the professional tour.

Ostertag won two titles on the ITF Women's Circuit, both in Switzerland, and in 2006 had a win over world number 75 Kaia Kanepi at a tournament in Prostejov, which is the highest ranked opponent she defeated on tour.

In Quebec in 2006 she qualified for her only WTA Tour main draw, winning her first round match over Raluca Olaru at the Challenge Bell tournament, before being eliminated in the second round by Olga Puchkova.

ITF finals

Singles: 4 (2–2)

References

External links
 
 

1987 births
Living people
German female tennis players
Sportspeople from Stuttgart
Tennis people from Baden-Württemberg